Glucose-6-phosphate exchanger SLC37A2 is a protein that in humans is encoded by the SLC37A2 gene.

References

Further reading 

 
 

Solute carrier family